Janów  is a village in Częstochowa County, Silesian Voivodeship, in southern Poland. It is the seat of the gmina (administrative district) called Gmina Janów.

The village has a population of 964.

References

External links
 Jewish Community in Janów on Virtual Shtetl

Villages in Częstochowa County